Shipulin is a Russian masculine surname, its feminine counterpart is Shipulina. It may refer to

 Anastasiya Shipulina, maiden name of Anastasiya Kuzmina, Russian-born Slovak biathlete
 Anton Shipulin (born 1987), Russian biathlete
Gennadiy Shipulin (born 1954), Russian volleyball coach
 Sergei Shipulin (born 1978), Russian footballer
Yekaterina Shipulina (born 1979), Russian ballerina

Russian-language surnames